The Frauen DFB-Pokal 1997–98 was the 18th season of the cup competition, Germany's second-most important title in women's football. In the final which was held in Berlin on 16 June 1998 FCR Duisburg defeated FSV Frankfurt 6–2, thus winning their first cup title. Duisburg had begun the season as FC Rumeln-Kaldenhausen, changing their name in midseason to FCR Duisburg.

1st round

Several clubs had byes in the first round.  Those clubs were automatically qualified for the 2nd round of the cup.

2nd round

3rd round

Quarter-finals

Semi-finals

Final

See also 
 Bundesliga 1997–98
 1997–98 DFB-Pokal men's competition

References 

DFB-Pokal Frauen seasons
Pokal
Fra